Noordwijk Lighthouse (in Dutch: Vuurtoren van Noordwijk aan Zee) is a lighthouse located in Noordwijk, South Holland, Netherlands.

History
The first mention of a lighthouse in Noordwijk was in 1444 when fishermen returned home when the sun went down.
The light was lit only when fishermen were active at sea. In the 19th century a wooden platform built which was replaced in 1854 by a stone turret. This light was demolished in 1913.

The current tower was built in 1921 as a reconnaissance tower for shipping, and its first lighting was at August 23, 1923. Ten years later the tower was painted white to protect it against the water.

Lighting
The light characteristic is three interruptions per 20 seconds. The pattern is 2x briefly and 1x long. The light has an intensity of 38,000 cd and a visibility of 18 nautical miles (33 km).

See also

 List of lighthouses in the Netherlands

References

  Information (also available in English)

External links

Rijksmonuments in South Holland
Lighthouses in South Holland
Noordwijk